Expedition 54 was the 54th expedition to the International Space Station, which began upon the departure of Soyuz MS-05 on December 14, 2017 and concluded upon the departure of Soyuz MS-06 on February 27, 2018. Alexander Misurkin, Mark Vande Hei and Joseph Acaba were transferred from Expedition 53, with Alexander Misurkin taking the commander role. Transfer of Command from Expedition 54 to Expedition 55 was done on February 26, 2018. Expedition 54 officially ended on February 27, 2018 23:08 UTC, with the undocking of Soyuz MS-06.

Crew

Spacewalks

*denotes spacewalks performed from the Pirs docking compartment in Russian Orlan suits.
All other spacewalks were performed from the Quest airlock.

Uncrewed spaceflights to the ISS
Resupply missions that visited the International Space Station during Expedition 54:

References

Expeditions to the International Space Station
2017 in spaceflight
2018 in spaceflight